Charles Allan Smart  (March 23, 1868 – June 4, 1937) was a Canadian politician and a seven-term Member of the Legislative Assembly of Quebec.

Early life

He was born in Montreal, Quebec on March 23, 1868. The son of Robert Smart, a shoemaker, originally from Aberdeen, and his wife Margaret Clark, from Arbroath, he was educated at the High School of Montreal. In 1881, he left school and became a clerk for with Alexander Buntin and Co., a stationery firm. In 1884, he moved to Tellier, Rothwell and Co., oil dealers, where he stayed for seven years.

City Councillor

Smart was a city councillor in Westmount in 1910.

Member of the legislature/Military Career

He successfully ran as a Conservative candidate in the provincial district of Westmount in the 1912 election. He was re-elected in the 1916, 1919, 1923, 1927, 1931 and 1935 elections.  He did not run for re-election in 1936.

Legislative Councillor

Smart was appointed to the Legislative Council of Quebec in 1936, but the institution did not resume its activities until after he died.

Death

He died on June 4, 1937.

References

1868 births
1937 deaths
Canadian Militia officers
6th Duke of Connaught's Royal Canadian Hussars
Canadian Expeditionary Force officers
Canadian military personnel of World War I
Conservative Party of Quebec MLCs
Conservative Party of Quebec MNAs
High School of Montreal alumni
Military personnel from Montreal
Politicians from Montreal
Canadian Companions of the Order of St Michael and St George
Canadian people of Scottish descent
Anglophone Quebec people